The 2018 Atlantic hurricane season was an event in the annual hurricane season in the north Atlantic Ocean. It as an above-average season for tropical cyclones for the third consecutive year. Though the season officially began on June 1, 2018 and ended November 30, 2018, dates adopted by convention and historically describe the period during each year when most tropical cyclones form,  it effectively started with the formation of Tropical Storm Alberto on May 25. The season's final storm, Hurricane Oscar, dissipated on October 31.

The year produced sixteen tropical depressions, all but one of which further intensified into named tropical storms. Of the fifteen named storms, eight developed into hurricanes, and two further intensified into major hurricanes, which are rated Category 3 or higher on the Saffir–Simpson scale. These two major hurricanes contributed to a majority of the season's severe destruction and loss of life, mainly in the United States.

Hurricane Florence formed near Cabo Verde on August 31, steered toward the west-northwest with little exception by a large area of high pressure to its north. Florence dealt a devastating blow to the Carolinas as it meandered across the region. Catastrophic, record-breaking flooding contributed to a majority of the storm's $24 billion in damage and 52 deaths, though significant storm surge along the coastline as well as an inland tornado outbreak caused severe damage as well. In early October, Hurricane Michael formed in the western Caribbean Sea, resulting in significant flooding across Central America and Cuba. This constituted the first landfall of a Category 5 hurricane in the United States since Hurricane Andrew in 1992, and only the fifth in recorded history, alongside "Labor Day", Camille, and "Okeechobee". In addition, Michael became the third deepest by atmospheric pressure, the fourth strongest by maximum winds, and the latest Category 5 hurricane to strike the United States on record. Michael killed 74 people and caused $25 billion in damage.

This timeline documents tropical cyclone formations, strengthening, weakening, landfalls, extratropical transitions, and dissipations during the season. It includes information that was not released throughout the season, meaning that data from post-storm reviews by the National Hurricane Center, such as a storm that was not initially warned upon, has been included.

By convention, meteorologists use one time zone when issuing forecasts and making observations: Coordinated Universal Time (UTC), and also use the 24-hour clock (where 00:00 = midnight UTC). The National Hurricane Center uses both UTC and the time zone where the center of the tropical cyclone is currently located. The time zones utilized (east to west) prior to 2020 were: Atlantic, Eastern, and Central. In this timeline, all information is listed by UTC first with the respective regional time included in parentheses. Additionally, figures for maximum sustained winds and position estimates are rounded to the nearest 5 units (knots, miles, or kilometers), following the convention used in the National Hurricane Center's products. Direct wind observations are rounded to the nearest whole number. Atmospheric pressures are listed to the nearest millibar and nearest hundredth of an inch of mercury.

Timeline

May 

May 25
 12:00 UTC (7:00 a.m.

May 26
 18:00 UTC (1:00 a.m.

May 28
 00:00 UTC (7:00 p.m.
 06:00 UTC (1:00 a.m.
 21:00 UTC (4:00 p.m.

May 29
 00:00 UTC (7:00 p.m.

May 31
 06:00 UTC (1:00 a.m.

June 

June 1
 The 2018 Atlantic hurricane season officially begins.
 No tropical cyclones form in the Atlantic Ocean during the month of June.

July 

July 4
 12:00 UTC (8:00 a.m.

July 5
 00:00 UTC (8:00 p.m.

July 6
 06:00 UTC (2:00 a.m.
 12:00 UTC (8:00 a.m.

July 7
12:00 UTC (8:00 a.m.

July 8
 06:00 UTC (2:00 a.m.
 12:00 UTC (8:00 a.m.

July 10
 12:00 UTC (8:00 a.m.

July 11
 00:00 UTC (8:00 p.m.
 18:00 UTC (2:00 p.m.
July 12
 12:00 UTC (8:00 a.m.
 18:00 UTC (2:00 p.m.

July 14
 12:00 UTC (8:00 a.m.

July 16
 00:00 UTC (8:00 p.m.

August

August 7
 06:00 UTC (2:00 a.m.

August 8
 00:00 UTC (8:00 p.m.

August 9
 00:00 UTC (8:00 p.m.
 18:00 UTC (2:00 p.m.

August 15
 06:00 UTC (2:00 a.m.
 12:00 UTC (8:00 a.m.

August 16
 12:00 UTC (8:00 a.m.
 18:00 UTC (2:00 p.m.

August 17
 18:00 UTC (2:00 p.m.

August 18
 00:00 UTC (8:00 p.m.

August 31
 18:00 UTC (2:00 p.m.

September 

September 1
 06:00 UTC (2:00 a.m.

September 3
 06:00 UTC (2:00 a.m.
 09:00 UTC (5:00 a.m.
 11:15 UTC (7:15 a.m.

September 4
 12:00 UTC (8:00 a.m.

September 5
 00:00 UTC (8:00 p.m.
 03:15 UTC (10:15 p.m.
 12:00 UTC (8:00 a.m.
 12:00 UTC (7:00 a.m.
 18:00 UTC (2:00 p.m.

September 6
 06:00 UTC (2:00 a.m.
 12:00 UTC (8:00 a.m.
 18:00 UTC (2:00 p.m.
 18:00 UTC (1:00 p.m.

September 7
 00:00 UTC (8:00 p.m.
 12:00 UTC (8:00 a.m.
 12:00 UTC (8:00 a.m.

September 8
 00:00 UTC (8:00 p.m.
 12:00 UTC (8:00 a.m.

September 9
 12:00 UTC (8:00 a.m.
18:00 UTC (2:00 p.m.

September 10
 00:00 UTC (8:00 p.m.
 06:00 UTC (2:00 a.m.
 12:00 UTC (8:00 a.m.
 12:00 UTC (8:00 a.m.
 18:00 UTC (2:00 p.m.

September 11
 00:00 UTC (8:00 p.m.
 00:00 UTC (8:00 p.m.
 12:00 UTC (8:00 a.m.
 18:00 UTC (2:00 p.m.

September 12
 06:00 UTC (2:00 a.m.
 12:00 UTC (8:00 a.m.
 18:00 UTC (2:00 p.m.

September 13
 12:00 UTC (8:00 a.m.
 12:00 UTC (8:00 a.m.

September 14
 00:00 UTC (8:00 p.m.
 11:15 UTC (7:15 a.m.

September 15
 00:00 UTC (8:00 p.m.
 00:00 UTC (8:00 p.m.
 00:00 UTC (8:00 p.m.
 06:00 UTC (2:00 a.m.

September 16
 12:00 UTC (8:00 a.m.
 12:00 UTC (8:00 a.m.
 18:00 UTC (2:00 p.m.

September 17
 12:00 UTC (8:00 a.m.

September 19
 00:00 UTC (8:00 p.m.

September 21
 18:00 UTC (2:00 p.m.

September 22
 00:00 UTC (8:00 p.m.
 06:00 UTC (2:00 a.m.
 12:00 UTC (8:00 a.m.

September 23
 00:00 UTC (8:00 p.m.
 12:00 UTC (8:00 a.m.
 12:00 UTC (8:00 a.m.

September 25
 00:00 UTC (8:00 p.m.
 12:00 UTC (8:00 a.m.

September 26
 00:00 UTC (8:00 p.m.
 12:00 UTC (8:00 a.m.
 18:00 UTC (2:00 p.m.

September 28
 00:30 UTC (8:30 p.m.
 12:00 UTC (8:00 a.m.

September 29
 00:00 UTC (8:00 p.m. AST September 28)Tropical Storm Kirk degenerates to a tropical wave a few hundred miles south of the United States Virgin Islands.
 18:00 UTC (2:00 p.m.

October 

October 3
 06:00 UTC (2:00 a.m.

October 4
 18:00 UTC (2:00 p.m.

October 7
 06:00 UTC (1:00 a.m.
 12:00 UTC (7:00 a.m.

October 8
 12:00 UTC (7:00 a.m.

October 9
 00:00 UTC (7:00 p.m.
 06:00 UTC (2:00 a.m.
 12:00 UTC (8:00 a.m.
 18:00 UTC (1:00 p.m.

October 10
 00:00 UTC (8:00 p.m.
 06:00 UTC (2:00 a.m.
 06:00 UTC (1:00 a.m.
 17:30 UTC (12:30 p.m. At this time, the powerful cyclone also makes landfall near Tyndall Air Force Base in Florida, becoming the fourth strongest, third deepest, and latest Category 5 hurricane to strike the United States in recorded history.
 18:00 UTC (1:00 p.m.

October 11
 00:00 UTC (8:00 p.m.
 06:00 UTC (2:00 a.m.

October 12
 00:00 UTC (8:00 p.m.
 00:00 UTC (8:00 p.m.
 18:00 UTC (2:00 p.m.

October 13
 00:00 UTC (8:00 p.m.
 18:00 UTC (2:00 p.m.

October 26
 18:00 UTC (2:00 p.m.

October 27
 18:00 UTC (2:00 p.m.

October 28
 18:00 UTC (2:00 p.m.

October 29
 18:00 UTC (2:00 p.m.

October 30
 00:00 UTC (8:00 p.m.
 18:00 UTC (2:00 p.m.

October 31
 18:00 UTC (2:00 p.m.

November 

 No tropical cyclones form in the Atlantic Ocean during the month of November.

November 30
The 2018 Atlantic hurricane season officially ends.

See also 
Lists of Atlantic hurricanes
Timeline of the 2018 Pacific hurricane season

References

External links 

 2018 Tropical Cyclone Advisory Archive, National Hurricane Center and Central Pacific Hurricane Center

2018 Atlantic hurricane season
2018
Articles which contain graphical timelines